The Indian locomotive class WDAP-5 is a class of diesel-electric dual mode locomotive that was developed in 2019 by Banaras Locomotive Works (BLW), Varanasi for Indian Railways. The model name stands for broad gauge (W), Diesel (D), AC Current (A), Passenger (P) and 5000 Horsepower (5). The locomotive can deliver 6120 hp (9.4 MW) in electric mode and 4500 hp (3.4 MW) in diesel mode. It is under development as of 2023.

Need for dual mode locomotive

Since 2016, Indian Railways has pushed for greater electrification of the railway network. In this interest, the government, in 2019, approved plans for 100% electrification. So far Indian Railways has electrified 52,247 route kilometers (RKM) that is about 80% of the total broad gauge network of Indian Railways (65,414 RKM, including Konkan Railway) by 31 March 2022. Using electric locomotives allows the railways to save time by giving a faster acceleration and also saves fuel costs. However, these advantages are offset under certain circumstances where the route of the train is partly electrified. In such cases, trains used to run with a diesel locomotive in non-electrified sections and would be switched with an electric locomotive as soon as they enter an electrified section. Instead of the benefits of electrification, Railways observed a loss of punctuality in such trains due to valuable time being lost to switch between diesel and electric locomotives. To counter this, in August 2019, Railways issued a circular, asking all zones to haul trains with a diesel locomotive if their route was not completely electrified. This meant that electrification of railway lines, unless completed end-to-end, did not provide any advantage. This problem had been identified by the Railways, way back in 2016, which is when RDSO was requested to study the feasibility of dual-mode locomotives as a stop-gap until 100% electrification was achieved.

Locomotive shed

References

Railway locomotives introduced in 2021
Electro-diesel locomotives of India